VIB may refer to:

 Véhicule d'Intervention Blindé, a 20mm-armed version of the Véhicule de l'Avant Blindé used by the French Air Force.
 Verliebt in Berlin, a German telenovela
 Villa Constitución Airport IATA code
 Virtual Instrumentation Beans, collection of visualization and data server components for OPC client development
 Vlaams Instituut voor Biotechnologie, a life sciences research institute in Flanders, Belgium
 VMware vSphere Installation Bundle, a packaging format to install software on VMware ESXi consisting of file archive, XML descriptor file, and signature file to convey level of trust
 Oflag VI-B, a World War II German POW camp near Dössel

Vib may refer to :
 Vib Gyor, a British band originating in Leeds
 a shortening for vibrator or vibration like in :
 Vib-Ribbon or Vib-Ripple, two video games for PlayStation consoles